The Fullness of Time is progressive metal band Redemption's second album overall, but the first to feature a band lineup, as opposed to a project lineup as found on the 2003 eponymous debut and featuring James Sherwood and Chris Quirarte of Prymary on bass guitar and drums, respectively. The vocals were provided by Fates Warning singer Ray Alder, who previously produced the first album and provided vocals for one song. This is the only album with Sherwood on the bass.

Reception
The album generally received positive reviews from magazines and webzines. Writing for Blabbermouth, Scott Alisoglu also praised the album and commented that the 16-minute track "Sapphire" was the standout piece of the album. Metal Storm's review was also complimentary calling it a "masterpiece."

Track listing
All songs written by Nick Van Dyk.

Import bonus tracks

Personnel
 Ray Alder - vocals
 Nick van Dyk - guitars, keyboards
 Bernie Versailles - guitars
 James Sherwood - bass
 Chris Quirarte - drums

References

Redemption (band) albums
2005 albums